Boyuk Bolagh (also Romanized as Boyūk Bolāgh) is a village in Ajorluy-ye Sharqi Rural District, Baruq District, Miandoab County, West Azerbaijan Province, Iran. At the 2006 census, its population was 193, in 39 families.

References 

Populated places in Miandoab County